Johann "Hans" Mock (9 December 1906 in Vienna – 22 May 1982) was an Austrian football midfielder.

He earned 12 caps for the Austria national football team. After the annexation of Austria by Germany, he earned 5 caps for the Germany national football team, and participated in the 1938 FIFA World Cup.

Career
 FC Nicholson (1924–1927)
 FK Austria Wien (1927–1942)

External links
Official website
RSSSF archive of results 1902–2003

References

1906 births
1982 deaths
Footballers from Vienna
Association football midfielders
Austrian footballers
Austria international footballers
German footballers
Germany international footballers
FK Austria Wien players
1938 FIFA World Cup players
Dual internationalists (football)